Silesia (minor planet designation: 257 Silesia) is a large Main belt asteroid, about 73 kilometers in diameter. It was discovered by Johann Palisa on 5 April 1886 at Vienna Observatory, Austria.

It is named after Silesia, the province of the discoverer's birthplace (nowadays most of Silesia is in Poland, but Palisa's birthplace is in the small part of Silesia that is in the Czech Republic).

References

External links 
 
 

000257
Discoveries by Johann Palisa
Named minor planets
000257
000257
18860405